Odell Bradley (born September 6, 1981) is an American former professional basketball player. He was a forward in the United States Basketball League and the Continental Basketball Association.

Early life
Bradley was born September 6, 1981, in Nashville, Tennessee. He played basketball at White Creek High School.

College career
Bradley played at Indiana University-Purdue University Indianapolis for the IUPUI Jaguars. While there, he led his team to the NCAA tournament.  In his last season there he averaged 23 points per game and 8 rebounds per game. While there, he won the Summit Player of the Year Award. He was named an honorable mention All-American by the Associated Press.

Professional career
Bradley was drafted by the United States Basketball League for the Cedar Rapids River Raiders. He later played in the Continental Basketball Association (CBA) where he led his team on scoring. Bradley was named to the All-CBA Second Team while playing for the Butte Daredevils in 2007 and was the CBA All-Star Game MVP in 2008. He also played for the American Basketball Association, where he made the All ABA Championship Finals Team.

References

1981 births
Living people
Alaska Aces (PBA) players
American expatriate basketball people in the Philippines
American men's basketball players
Basketball players from Nashville, Tennessee
Forwards (basketball)
IUPUI Jaguars men's basketball players
Philippine Basketball Association imports